Latvia participated in the IX Summer Paralympic Games in Barcelona, Spain.

See also
1992 Summer Paralympics
Latvia at the 1992 Summer Olympics

External links
International Paralympic Committee
Latvian Paralympic Committee

Nations at the 1992 Summer Paralympics
1992
Paralympics